Nick Lazzarini (born August 4, 1984) is an American dancer.  He is best known as the first season winner on the Fox reality show So You Think You Can Dance.  He is a trained dancer in jazz, lyrical, hip hop, ballet and modern dance styles.

Early life

Lazzarini was born to Italian American parents. Lazzarini grew up in Mountain View, California in the San Francisco Bay Area. He graduated from Springer Elementary in Mountain View, California and Blach Intermediate School in Los Altos, California. Lazzarini began attending Showbiz when he was 8 years old. In the early 2000s, he travelled every other weekend from San Francisco to Fresno to dance at Dance Rage.  He was trained under Keith Banks. His performance at Showbiz in 2001 caught the attention of Dance Spirit magazine, and they featured him on the cover of their October 2001 issue.

At the time of his appearance on "So You Think You Can Dance," he was living in Van Nuys, California.

Early career
Lazzarini has been dancing since age four and began teaching and doing choreography at age fourteen.

In 2003, Lazzarini, competing as part of a dance group called Hot Under The Collar, appeared on CBS's "Star Search" remake.

Prior to competing on the Fox reality show, Lazzarini spent two years at the Dance Company of San Francisco and also toured Europe with the RAW dance company, which was founded by choreographer Mia Michaels, one of the judges on "So You Think You Can Dance".

So You Think You Can Dance
Lazzarini was the first person who auditioned for the show before it even began. Nigel and Bonnie Lythgoe approached him to see if he would be a good match for a show they were then planning.  For his win on the first season of the show, Lazzarini received a  cash prize of $100,000 and the use of a penthouse apartment in Manhattan for one year.  According to judge Nigel Lythgoe, Lazzarini chose to exchange the value of the apartment for a cash equivalent.

Post SYTYCD

Lazzarini became the first person ever to appear on the cover of Dance Spirit twice, with the January 2006 issue.  Beginning in March 2006, Lazzarini became a founding member (of 15) of the Evolution Dance Company, which debuted  at the OC Pavilion in Santa Ana, California, alongside SYTYCD alumni Melody Lacayanga and Craig DeRosa.  Choreographers in the company include Liz Imperio and Mia Michaels.

Lazzarini was formerly a faculty member of Jump Dance Convention (www.breakthefloor.com).

In November 2011, Oxygen Media announced that Nick, along with fellow dancers Travis Wall, Teddy Forance, and Kyle Robinson, is part of a series in development titled All the Right Moves. This docu-series follows the four dancers as they work to start a new dance company in LA called Shaping Sound. He is co-creator of Shaping Sound, a traveling dance company that was still active in 2017.

Personal life
Lazzarini is best friends with Melody Lacayanga, and they have been since their teens. He is also best friends with dancer and choreographer Travis Wall, whom he has known since he was 9 years old.  He was fired from the dance company Break the Floor for posting then removing a video of himself online masturbating.

Awards and honors
Junior Mr. Dance of America
Teen Mr. Dance of America

See also
 List of dancers

References

External links
Star Search bio page

"Nick Lazzarini, star of FOX's 'So You Think You Can Dance,' returns home for a visit," Eliza Ridgeway, Los Altos Town Crier, October 26, 2005
Help Is On the Way, Cast Details, 2006
"Team Of Young Dancers Learns From Moves Of Professionals," Megan Boswell, Southern Maryland Newspapers Online, November 28, 2007
"Yon Students Of Blach Doth Hold Medieval Faire," Los Altos Town Crier, June 16, 1997
.pdf document, "DMA 2006 Intensive Ballet/Convention Faculty," Dance Masters of America
"So Let's Dance! The Winner Of Fox TV's 'So You think You Can Dance?,'" Kaustuv Basu, The Saratoga News, October 26, 2005

Living people
American male dancers
So You Think You Can Dance winners
1984 births
LGBT dancers
American LGBT entertainers
LGBT people from California
Gay entertainers
Modern dancers
American jazz dancers
American people of Italian descent
So You Think You Can Dance (American TV series) contestants
21st-century American dancers
People from Mountain View, California